High Anxiety is the seventh full-length album by the rock band Therapy?, and was the first to be released on Spitfire Records. It was released on 5 May 2003. The album was recorded from December 2002 to January 2003 at Parkgate Studios in Hastings.

"High Anxiety" was the first album to feature drummer Neil Cooper, and the last recorded with guitarist/cellist Martin McCarrick, who departed in 2004. The album has a similar production value to Troublegum, and is a return to that album's sense of melodic punk.

The album title is taken from a 1977 Mel Brooks movie of the same name.

The US released limited edition CD-ROM included the video of If It Kills Me. The album reached number 113 in the UK Albums Chart.

The album was released on CD and cassette.

Polish label Metal Mind Productions re-released the album on 2 November 2009. The album was remastered using 24-Bit technology, limited to 1000 copies, on a gold disk digipak CD.

Track listing 
All songs written by Therapy?

Personnel 
Therapy?
Andy Cairns – vocals, guitar
Neil Cooper – drums
Martin McCarrick – guitar, cello
Michael McKeegan – bass
Technical
Pete Bartlett – producer
Therapy? – producer
Chris Sheldon – mixing, producer "Not in Any Name"
Dan Turner – engineer
Mick Hutson – photography
Curt Evans – design

Singles 
"If It Kills Me"/"Rust" was released on 21 April 2003 with "Mama You Can Call the Ambulance Now" and "If It Kills Me (video)". This single reached number 76 in the UK Singles Chart.
"My Voodoo Doll" was released on 17 November 2003 with "If It Kills Me (live)", "Screamager (live)" and "Teethgrinder (live)". This CD was signed, limited to 1000 copies and sold at gigs only. Live tracks were recorded at the Mandela Hall, Belfast on 6 June 2003.

Promo video 
"If It Kills Me"

Charts

References 

2003 albums
Spitfire Records albums
Therapy? albums
Albums produced by Pete Bartlett